Bernard Sleigh (1872 – 7 December 1954) was an English mural painter, stained-glass artist, illustrator and wood engraver, best known for An Ancient Mappe of Fairyland, Newly Discovered and Set Forth, which depicts numerous characters from legends and fairytales. There is a copy of The Ancient Mappe in the Library of Congress in Washington, D.C. He was a member of the Royal Birmingham Society of Artists between 1923 and 1928. As a young man, Sleigh was greatly inspired by the work of George MacDonald and William Morris.

Education and work
Born in Birmingham, Sleigh was apprenticed to a wood engraver at the age of 14 and attended the Birmingham School of Art. He was a student of Arthur Gaskin (1862–1928), who had worked with Edward Burne-Jones. While at the school, he came under the influence of the Birmingham Group. Being especially skilled in wood engraving, he soon caught the public eye through his engravings for books. He joined the Society of Mural Decorators and Painters in Tempera. His advertising after 1918 says he could do wall paintings, memorial windows and inscriptions in metal. At exhibitions of the Royal Birmingham Society of Artists, he offered to create furniture inlays. In 1897 he became a member of the Bromsgrove Guild, receiving commissions for decorating churches such as Wallasey Memorial Unitarian Church in Cheshire, and designing stained-glass windows.

After sending Henry Payne to Chelsea to study stained-glass technique, the Birmingham School of Art added stained-glass work to their curriculum in 1900. Bernard Sleigh was among the first to enrol for the course.

Sleigh wrote a series of stories about fairies, The Gates of Horn, published in 1927. Although Sleigh aimed the book at an adult audience, his publishers, J. M. Dent, instead marketed the book for children, and it was a commercial failure. Anderson describes the stories in The Gates of Horn as "engaging and well-told".

Marriage and retirement
In 1900 he married Stella D. Phillp, producing a son, Brocas Linwood, in 1902 and in 1906 a daughter, Barbara Grace de Riemer, who became a children's writer. The marriage was dissolved in about 1914.

Sleigh retired to Chipping Campden in 1937, like his mentor Arthur Gaskin, moving into Old Forge Cottage in Cider Mill Lane. His imagery by then had turned from romantic medievalism to a world peopled by fairies and elves. He died on 7 December 1954, leaving an estate valued at £2,187, and probate was granted to Miss Ivy Ann Ellis. Ellis had been "his regular collaborator and constant companion right up until the time of death".

Bibliography

The Sea King's Daughter & other poems, Mark, Amy; G. Napier, Birmingham, 1895, illustrated and printed by Bernard Sleigh
The Praise of Folie. Moriae Encomium A booke made in Latin by that great clerke Erasmus Roterodame. Englished by Sir Thomas Chaloner, Erasmus, Essex House Press, 1901, limited edition, 250 copies, woodcuts by Bernard Sleigh after William Strang
English Book Illustration of To-day. Intro. by Alfred W. Pollard, Sketchley, R. E. D.;, Trench, Trubner and Co, Ltd., London, 1903, with various contributors including Bernard Sleigh
An Anciente Mappe of Fairyland, Newly Discovered and Set Forth, in the Library of Congress. Illustration by Bernard Sleigh, c. 1920
A Faery Pageant, Sleigh, Bernard, Birmingham, 1924, poem, limited edition, 475 copies, with illustrations by the author
The Gates of Horn, Ed. Sleigh, Bernard, J. M. Dent & Sons Ltd., London, 1926
Franz Schubert: A Sequence of Sonnets and a Prose Anthology, GREW, Eva Mary. The British Musicians Office, Birmingham, 1928, with page decorations by Bernard Sleigh
A Handbook of Elementary Design, Sleigh, Bernard, R.B.S.A., Sir Isaac Pitman & Sons, Ltd, London, 1930
Carols, Their Origin, Music and Connection with Mystery-Plays. William J Phillips, Routledge, not dated, with wood engravings by Bernard Sleigh
Wood Engraving since Eighteen-Ninety, Sleigh, Bernard; Sir Isaac Pitman, London, 1932
Witchcraft, Sleigh, Bernard. Oriole Press, New Jersey, 1934, illustrated by Bernard Sleigh
The Song of Songs, Renan, Ernest.; City of Birmingham School of Printing, Birmingham, 1937, with decorations by Bernard Sleigh
Kanga Creek, An Australian Idyll, Ellis, Havelock, Oriole Press, New Jersey, 1938, limited edition, 250 copies, illustrations by Bernard Sleigh and Ivy Anne Ellis
The Immortal Hour, Fiona McLeod (Sharp William) City of Birmingham School of Printing, 1939, illustrated by Bernard Sleigh

References

English artists
British illustrators
English wood engravers
English fantasy writers
1872 births
1954 deaths
Artists from Birmingham, West Midlands
Members and Associates of the Royal Birmingham Society of Artists